Evelyne Müller (born 29 December 1962) is a Swiss former racing cyclist. She was the Swiss National Road Race champion in 1983.

References

External links

1962 births
Living people
Swiss female cyclists
Place of birth missing (living people)